Fermín Barva was a Filipino pre-war director who made his film debut in a silent movie Ang Dugong Makamandag, Englist title The Poisonous Blood.

Filmography

1932 – Ang Dugong Makamandag aka The Poisonous Blood

1934 - Mag-inang Mahirap

1934 - Hinagpis ng Magulang aka Wrath of Parents

1934 - X3X

1934 - Liwayway ng Kalayaan aka Dawn if Freedom

1935 - Ang Gulong ng Buhay aka The Wheel of Life

1936 - Malambot na Bato aka Soft Stone

1937 - Gamu-Gamong Naging Lawin

1937 - Umaraw sa Hatinggabi aka Midnight Becomes Morning

1937 - Magkapatid

1937 - Sanga-Sangang Dila

1937 - Sampaguitang Walang Bango

1938 - Makasalanan at Birhen - Philippine National Pictures

1939 - Pag-ibig ng Isang Ina - Philippine Artist Guild aka Mother's Love

1949 - He Promised to Return -  [Movietec]

1950 - The Pirates Go to Town -  Lebran Pictures

1950 - Beasts of the East

1951 - Hiwaga ng Langit - Fortune Pictures aka Mystery of Heaven

1953 - Malapit sa Diyos - Lebran Pictures aka Close to God

1953 - Babaing Kalbo - Lebran Pictures aka Bald Lady

External links

Year of death missing
Filipino film directors